Carolin "Cal" Bouchard (born 27 November 1977) is a Canadian former basketball player who competed in the 2000 Summer Olympics.

Bouchard was born in Richmond, British Columbia.

References

1977 births
Living people
Canadian women's basketball players
Olympic basketball players of Canada
Basketball players at the 2000 Summer Olympics